Transcription initiation protein SPT3 homolog is a protein that in humans is encoded by the SUPT3H gene.

Interactions 

Transcription initiation protein SPT3 homolog has been shown to interact with GCN5L2, TAF6L, TADA3L, TAF5L, SF3B3, SUPT7L, Myc, TAF9, Transformation/transcription domain-associated protein, TAF12, TAF10, TAF4 and DDB1.

Model organisms
Model organisms have been used in the study of SUPT3H function. A conditional knockout mouse line called Supt3tm1a(EUCOMM)Hmgu was generated at the Wellcome Trust Sanger Institute. Male and female animals underwent a standardized phenotypic screen to determine the effects of deletion. Additional screens performed:  - In-depth immunological phenotyping

References

Further reading